Ashokdham Mandir also known as Indradamneshwar Mahadev Mandir is located at ASHOK DHAM RAJAUNA CHOUKI in Lakhisarai district, Bihar. It is a temple complex having Indradamneshwar Mahadev Mandir in the center dedicated to the primary deity lord Shiva surrounded by three more temples dedicated to Goddess Parvati, the mount of the Shiva Nandi and Goddess Durga.

History
It is said that this place has been a center of worship since the 8th century. Narayan Pal, the 6th emperor of Pala Empire initiated the regular worship of the Shivlingam in the 8th century. In the 12th century, a temple was built on this place by King Indradyumna. It is said that the temple was demolished and for many years there were no remains above ground.

On 7 April 1977, two boys named Ashok and Gajanand were discovered the Giant Shivlingam beneath the ground while playing a traditional Gilli-danda game. On 11 February 1993, the Shankaracharya of Jagannathpuri inaugurated the restructure of the temple complex. The current temple complex building started on 15 November 2002 under Shree Indradamneshwar Mahadev Mandir Trust.

Maha Shivrati
Every year on the day of Maha Shivratri millions of pilgrims from various parts of India visit this shrine and offer sacred water of Ganges to the deity. For stay here a dharmshala (guesthouse) is built where pilgrims stays after the long journey.

Gallery

See also
 Surajgarha
 Barahiya

References

Shiva temples in Bihar
Hindu temples in Bihar
Lakhisarai district